Ibrahima Camara may refer to:

Ibrahima Camara (footballer, born 1985), Guinean footballer
Ibrahima Camara (footballer, born 1992), Guinean footballer
Ibrahima Camará (footballer, born 1999), Guinean footballer

See also
Ibrahim Camara, Guinean judoka